Suicide Hill  is a crime fiction novel written by James Ellroy. 
Released in 1986, it is the third and final installment of the Lloyd Hopkins Trilogy.

In an October 13, 2017 interview, actor Tom Hanks stated that he would be interested in playing the part of Lloyd Hopkins if a film or stage adaptation was to be put into production.

Plot summary
The novel begins with a psychiatrist's assessment recommending that Hopkins be immediately retired from duty with a full pension following the events of Because the Night (1984).

Hopkins eludes compulsory retirement with attachment as LAPD liaison officer to an FBI bank robbery investigation. Hopkins then manipulates his way into robbery/homicide investigations.  The novel's story line and characters twist and turn.

References

External links
 review from goodreads.com

1985 American novels
Novels by James Ellroy
Fictional portrayals of the Los Angeles Police Department